Matthews Hall is a building on the Tempe campus of Arizona State University. Built in 1918, it was added to the National Register of Historic Places in 1985.

History
Matthews Hall is the oldest intact dormitory on the ASU campus. It was designed by L.G. Knipe and dedicated in 1920 as a men's dormitory. It was named for the president of the Tempe Normal School, Dr. Arthur John Matthews.

By 1930, it was a women's dormitory, and when the new library on campus was named the Matthews Library in honor of Dr. Matthews's 30 years as president, the dormitory was renamed Carrie Matthews Hall for the president's wife. (The library became known as Matthews Center upon its conversion in the 1960s.)

The building currently houses a photography gallery and offices for the Herberger Institute for Design and the Arts. It is also home to the ASU Forensics (Speech & Debate) team.

Architecture
Matthews Hall is a symmetrical, elongated two-story building with telescoping side wings and sleeping porch bays. The building has a concrete foundation with buff brick facing; the interiors feature wood detailing.

The building has extensive Prairie School architectural styling, seen in the building's massing and details, such as broad wooden cornices, Union Jack vent covers, and grouped double-hung windows. The original stairway and living room fireplace remain in the interior.

The building also demonstrates an attempt to acclimate the building to the Arizona climate. Sleeping spaces project out from the main building to capture nighttime breezes.

Some modifications have been made; the sleeping porches have been converted to offices, while modern exit stairs have been added and windows were filled in.

References

School buildings on the National Register of Historic Places in Arizona
Prairie School architecture in Arizona
Residential buildings completed in 1918
Buildings and structures in Tempe, Arizona
Arizona State University buildings
National Register of Historic Places in Maricopa County, Arizona
1918 establishments in Arizona